The Egypt national badminton team represents Egypt in international badminton team competitions. The Egyptian Badminton Federation controls the national team.

The Egyptian women's team won the 2020 All Africa Men's and Women's Team Badminton Championships in the women's team event. This qualified Egypt for the Uber Cup for the first time. The women's team made their debut in the 2020 Thomas & Uber Cup finals and was placed into Group C with South Korea, Chinese Taipei and Tahiti. The team was placed 3rd in the group after defeating Tahiti in the tie and was placed 9th on the final rankings.

The men's team however failed to qualify for the Thomas Cup after losing to Algeria in the 2020 All Africa Men's and Women's Team Badminton Championships qualifiers. The mixed team also made their debut in the 2021 Sudirman Cup.

Participation in BWF competitions

Uber Cup

Sudirman Cup

Participation in African Badminton Championships 
The Egyptian women's and mixed team are two-time champions in the All Africa Men's and Women's Team Badminton Championships. This earned the team a spot for the Uber Cup and the Sudirman Cup in 2021.

Men's team

Women's team

Mixed team

Participation in Africa Games

Participation in Pan Arab Games 

Men's team

Women's team

Current squad 

Men
Abdelrahman Abdelhakim
Monier Fayez Botros
Adham Hatem Elgamal
Mahmoud Montaser
Mohamed Mostafa Kamel
Ahmed Salah

Women
Doha Hany
Hadia Hosny
Nour Ahmed Youssri
Jana Ashraf
Hana Tarek Mohamed
Rahma Mohamed Saad Eladawy

References

Badminton
National badminton teams
Badminton in Egypt